This article summarizes the events, album releases, and album release dates in hip hop music for the year 1983.

Released albums

See also
Last article: 1982 in hip hop music
Next article: 1984 in hip hop music

References

Hip hop
Hip hop music by year